"" ("The Dawn of a New Day") is the national anthem of Benin. Written and composed by Father Gilbert Jean Dagnon, it was adopted upon independence of the Republic of Dahomey from France in 1960.

Lyrics

French original

In local languages

References

External links
 Benin: L'Aube Nouvelle - Audio of the national anthem of Benin, with information and lyrics (archive link)

African anthems
Beninese music
National symbols of Benin
National anthem compositions in B-flat major